Aghbarg is town and union council of Quetta District in the Balochistan province of Pakistan. It lies to the north-east of the district capital Quetta, and has an altitude of 2056m (6748ft).

References

Populated places in Quetta District
Union councils of Balochistan, Pakistan